Ruu is a village in Jõelähtme Parish, Harju County in northern Estonia.

Gallery

References

Villages in Harju County